Verbascum phlomoides, the orange mullein, woolly mullein (which often refers to Verbascum thapsus), or clasping-leaf mullein, is a plant species in the family Scrophulariaceae native to Europe and Asia Minor. It is a widespread weed in North America. The Royal Horticultural Society considered it to be a good plant to attract pollinators. It is used as a respiratory catarrh and diuretic.

References

Footnotes

phlomoides
Garden plants of Europe
Medicinal plants of Europe